The Indian state of Rajasthan is divided into 33 districts for administrative purposes. On 17 March 2023, Chief Minister of Rajasthan Ashok Gehlot has announced creation of 19 new districts and Jaipur district and Jodhpur district will ceased to exist, thus number of districts will go up to 50. The responsibilities of district management are carried out by All-India officials and state-appointed officials. The All-India officials in each district are a Deputy Commissioner or district Magistrate (from the Indian Administrative Service), a Superintendent of Police (from the Indian Police Service) and a Deputy Conservator of Forests (from the Indian Forest Service), each of which is assisted by officers of various Rajasthan state services. The state-appointed officials are responsible for matters such as health, education, and other primary facilities.

List of districts

Divisions

Proposed division

 Banswara division
 Pali division
 Sikar division

Proposed districts

Newly declared districts
On 17 March 2023, CM Ashok Gehlot made announcment in Rajasthan Legislative Assembly that new 19 districts will be formed along with 3 new divisions in state. The number of district will increased to 50 while existing Jaipur(united) and Jodhpur(united) will ceased to be exist.

Popular demands
Pratapgarh the last district was formed in 2008, ever since the demand to form new district is coming from various parts of Rajasthan. There are demands for more than 50 districts. Most notable new district forming demands are given below

References

See also
 Rajasthan
 Outline of Rajasthan
 Tourism in Rajasthan

 
Rajasthan
Districts